The 2014 Towson Tigers football team represented Towson University in the 2014 NCAA Division I FCS football season. They were led by sixth-year head coach Rob Ambrose and played their home games at Johnny Unitas Stadium. As members of the Colonial Athletic Association, they finished the season 4–8, 2–6 in CAA play to finish in tenth place.

Schedule

Ranking movements

References

Towson
Towson Tigers football seasons
Towson Tigers football